Ackton is a hamlet near Pontefract in the English county of West Yorkshire.

Historically part of the West Riding of Yorkshire, the name "Ackton" means "oak-tree farmstead". It is formed from the Old Scandinavian word eik ("oak-tree") and the Old English word tūn ("farmstead, village, enclosure"). The first element of the name indicates the presence of settlers from Scandinavia in Ackton whose dialect influenced the name of the settlement. Ackton appeared as Aitone  in the Domesday Book of 1086. The village is mentioned again, this time more correctly,  as Aicton.

References

External links
 
 

Hamlets in West Yorkshire
Featherstone